Bernhard Schlink (born 6 July 1944) is a German lawyer, academic, and novelist. He is best known for his novel The Reader, which was first published in 1995 and became an international bestseller. He won the 2014 Park Kyong-ni Prize.

Early life
He was born in Großdornberg, near Bielefeld, to a German father (Edmund Schlink) and a Swiss mother, the youngest of four children. His mother, Irmgard, had been a theology student of his father, whom she married in 1938. (Edmund Schlink's first wife had died in 1936.) Bernhard's father had been a seminary professor and pastor in the anti-Nazi Confessing Church. In 1946, he became a professor of dogmatic and ecumenical theology at Heidelberg University, where he would serve until his retirement in 1971. Over the course of four decades, Edmund Schlink became one of the most famous and influential Lutheran theologians in the world and a key participant in the modern Ecumenical Movement. Bernhard Schlink was brought up in Heidelberg from the age of two. He studied law at West Berlin's Free University, graduating in 1968.

Schlink became a judge at the Constitutional Court of the federal state of North Rhine-Westphalia in 1988 and in 1992 a professor for public law and the philosophy of law at Humboldt University, Berlin. Among Schlink's academic students are Stefan Korioth and Ralf Poscher. He retired in January 2006.

Career
Schlink studied law at the University of Heidelberg and at the Free University of Berlin. He worked as a scientific assistant at the Universities of Darmstadt, Bielefeld and Freiburg. He had been a law professor at the University of Bonn and Johann Wolfgang Goethe University Frankfurt am Main before he started in 1992 at Humboldt University of Berlin. His career as a writer began with several detective novels with the main character named Selb—a play on the German word for "self"—(the first, Self's Punishment, co-written with  being available in the UK).

In 1995, he published The Reader (Der Vorleser), a novel about a teenager who has an affair with a woman in her thirties who suddenly vanishes but whom he meets again as a law student when visiting a trial about war crimes. The book became a bestseller both in Germany and the United States and was translated into 39 languages. It was the first German book to reach the No. 1 position in the New York Times bestseller list. In 1997, it won the Hans Fallada Prize, a German literary award, and the Prix Laure Bataillon for works translated into French.  In 1999 it was awarded the Welt-Literaturpreis of the newspaper Die Welt.

In 2000, Schlink published a collection of short fiction called .  A January 2008 literary tour, including an appearance in San Francisco for City Arts & Lectures, was canceled due to Schlink's recovery from minor surgery.

In 2008, Stephen Daldry directed a film adaptation of The Reader. In 2010, his non-fiction political history, Guilt About the Past was published by Beautiful Books Limited (UK).

, Schlink divides his time between New York and Berlin. He is a member of PEN Centre Germany.

Prizes
 1989 Friedrich-Glauser-Preis for Die gordische Schleife
 1993 Deutscher Krimi Preis for Selbs Betrug
 1995 Stern des Jahres ("Star of the Year") from the Munich newspaper Abendzeitung ("Evening News") for Der Vorleser
 1997 Grinzane Cavour Prize (Italian) for Der Vorleser
 1997 Prix Laure Bataillon (French) for Der Vorleser
 1998 Hans Fallada Prize for Der Vorleser
 1999 Welt-Literaturpreis for life works
 2000 Heinrich Heine Prize of the "Heinrich-Heine-Gesellschaft" at Hamburg
 2000 Evangelischer Buchpreis for Der Vorleser
 2000 Cultural prize of the Japanese newspaper Mainichi Shimbun awarded yearly to a Japanese bestseller, for Der Vorleser
 2004 Officer's Cross of the Order of Merit of the Federal Republic of Germany
 2014 Park Kyong-ni Prize (South Korea)

Bibliography

Literary works in German

 1962 Der Andere 
 1987 Selbs Justiz (Self's Punishment; with Walter Popp)
 1988 Die gordische Schleife (The Gordian Knot), Zurich: Diogenes
 1992 Selbs Betrug, Zurich: Diogenes
 1995 Der Vorleser (The Reader), Zurich: Diogenes
 2000 Liebesfluchten (Flights of Love), Zurich: Diogenes
 2001 Selbs Mord (Self's Murder), Zurich: Diogenes
 2006 Die Heimkehr (Homecoming: A Novel), Zurich: Diogenes
 2008 Das Wochenende (The Weekend: A Novel), Zurich: Diogenes
 2010 Sommerlügen – Geschichten (~ Summer Lies: Stories), Zurich: Diogenes
 2011 Gedanken über das Schreiben. Heidelberger Poetikvorlesungen. (Essays) Zurich: Diogenes, 
 2014 Die Frau auf der Treppe. (Novel) Zurich: Diogenes, 
 2018 Olga (Novel) Zurich: Diogenes,

Other works in German
 1976 Abwägung im Verfassungsrecht, Berlin: Duncker und Humblot
 1980 Rechtlicher Wandel durch richterliche Entscheidung: Beitraege zu einer Entscheidungstheorie der richterlichen Innovation, co-edited with Jan Harenburg and Adalbert Podlech, Darmstadt: Toeche-Mittler
 1982 Die Amtshilfe: Ein Beitrag zu einer Lehre von der Gewaltenteilung in der Verwaltung, Berlin: Duncker & Humblot
 1985 Grundrechte, Staatsrecht II, co-authored with Bodo Pieroth, Heidelberg: C.F. Müller
 2002 Polizei- und Ordnungsrecht, co-authored with Bodo Pieroth and Michael Kniesel, Munich: Beck
 2005 Vergewisserungen: über Politik, Recht, Schreiben und Glauben, Zurich: Diogenes
 2015 Erkundungen zu Geschichte, Moral Recht und Glauben, Zurich: Diogenes

Titles in English
 1997 The Reader, translated by Carol Brown Janeway, New York: Pantheon Books
 2001 Flights of Love: Stories, translated by John E. Woods, New York: Pantheon Books
 2005 Self's Punishment, Bernhard Schlink and Walter Popp, translated by Rebecca Morrison, New York: Vintage Books
 2007 Self's Deception, translated by Peter Constantine, New York: Vintage Crime/Black Lizard
 2007 Homecoming translated by Michael Henry Heim, New York: Pantheon Books
 2009 Self's Murder, translated by Peter Constantine, London: Weidenfeld & Nicolson
 2009 Guilt about the Past, University of Queensland Press, 9 January 2009, Beautiful Books Limited (UK) February 2010 
 2010 The Weekend: A Novel, translated by Shaun Whiteside – October 2010
 2012 Summer Lies (short stories), translated by Carol Brown Janeway, New York: Pantheon Books 
 2016 The Woman on the Stairs. (Novel), translated by Joyce Hackett and Bradley Schmidt. London: Orion 
2020 Olga. (Novel), translated by Charlotte Collins, London: Weidenfeld & Nicolson

References

External links 

 Bernhard Schlink titles available from Orion Books
 Guaranteeing truth, and avoiding it an extract from Schlink's book, Guilt About The Past, in the Sydney Morning Herald
 VIDEO  Bernhard Schlink delivers the keynote address at the 2009 Melbourne Writers Festival on ABC FORA

1944 births
20th-century German judges
20th-century German male writers
20th-century German novelists
21st-century German novelists
21st-century German male writers
German crime fiction writers
German expatriates in the United States
German male novelists
German scholars of constitutional law
Writers from Heidelberg
Academic staff of the Humboldt University of Berlin
Living people
Officers Crosses of the Order of Merit of the Federal Republic of Germany
Writers from Bielefeld
Jurists from Heidelberg
Philosophers of law
Scholars of administrative law
Academic staff of Technische Universität Darmstadt